Phineas and Ferb is an American animated musical-comedy television series created by Dan Povenmire and Jeff "Swampy" Marsh for Disney Channel and Disney XD. The program follows Phineas Flynn and his stepbrother Ferb Fletcher during summer vacation. Every day, the boys embark on a grand new project, which annoys their controlling older sister Candace, who frequently tries to reveal their shenanigans to her and Phineas' mother, Linda Flynn-Fletcher, and less frequently to Ferb's father, Lawrence Fletcher.

Two episodes premiered as previews of the series on August 17, 2007 and September 28, 2007, and the series officially premiered on February 1, 2008. Episodes would premiere on either Disney Channel or Disney XD, and the show originally concluded on June 12, 2015. On January 13, 2023, Disney Branded Television announced at the Television Critics Association that the show would be revived with two seasons, containing a combined total of 40 episodes.

Series overview

Episodes

Season 1 (2007–09)

Season 2 (2009–11)

Season 3 (2011–12)

Season 4 (2012–15)

Other media

Films

"O.W.C.A. Files" 
"O.W.C.A. Files" is an hour-long special on Disney XD aired after the original series finale. While the episode was set to air during the regular season, it was later announced by Disney on May 7, 2015 that the show would end with "Last Day of Summer" on June 12, 2015, and that the episode would air as a stand-alone special on the Disney XD network. On Disney+, the episode is split into two parts.

The episode focuses on the O.W.C.A. (Organization Without a Cool Acronym), Agent P and Dr. Doofenshmirtz along with several new agents.

Milo Murphy's Law crossover

Shorts

Chibi Tiny Tales
Chibi Tiny Tales: Phineas and Ferb is a series of shorts that depict the characters in chibi-style animation. The shorts are a loose follow up to the Chibi Tiny Tales made for Amphibia and before that Big Hero 6: The Series. The new shorts were made in conjunction with the release of Phineas and Ferb the Movie: Candace Against the Universe. The first three shorts originally aired on Disney Channel on August 22, 2020, as a part of a Phineas and Ferb marathon.

Broken Karaoke

Home media

Notes

References

General references

External links 
 
        

 
Lists of American children's animated television series episodes
Lists of Disney Channel television series episodes